Eleven Times Square is an office and retail tower located at 640 Eighth Avenue, at the intersection with West 42nd Street, in the Times Square and West Midtown neighborhoods of Manhattan, New York City. The 40-story,  tower rises , making it the 131st tallest building in New York City. The structure is directly east of the Port Authority Bus Terminal and immediately north of The New York Times Building.

Completed in 2011, Eleven Times Square was developed by New York City-based SJP Properties in partnership with Prudential Real Estate Investors, and was designed by architect Dan Kaplan of FXFOWLE.

Architecture
11 Times Square has been certified by the Leadership in Energy and Environmental Design as an environmentally friendly building. It features concierge-level services including a high-tech elevator dispatch system; an advanced visitor check-in system; a secured, fully efficient loading dock; and a messenger/mail center and delivery area specifically designed to maximize ease of use by tenants. The building also provides LEED Platinum-level indoor air quality and features highly efficient office space with floor-to-ceiling windows and column-free corner offices, as well as multiple private terraces. 11 Times Square's lobby features a kinetic mobile installation designed by artist Tim Prentice.

The building is in close proximity to several modes of public transportation. The Port Authority Bus Terminal is directly across Eighth Avenue to the west. In addition, it has direct access to the New York City Subway, with an entrance to the Times Square–42nd Street/Port Authority Bus Terminal subway station inside the lot line.

History
The project's developers began constructing the building in 2007 on spec without a single lease signed. Global law firm Proskauer Rose was the first to sign on at the project, taking roughly a third of the building's space in 2010. By the time the building opened in 2011, it was still only 40% leased.

In February 2015, Norges Bank Investment Management purchased a 45-percent stake in Eleven Times Square. SJP Properties and Prudential Real Estate Investors continue to own and control the building, and SJP Properties continues to manage, lease and operate the building.

Tenants
Tenants include Microsoft Corp., law firm Proskauer Rose, hedge fund Moore Capital Management, British Telecom, E*TRADE, Kepos Capital and eMarketer. Before opening, the National Basketball Association, law firm Morrison & Foerster, and Buffalo Wild Wings had considered leasing space in the building but ultimately declined.

The tower has  of retail space. In 2017, the retail space was leased to Spanish company Parques Reunidos, which planned to open a Lionsgate Entertainment Palace before withdrawing in June 2019.

References

External links 

 Official site

42nd Street (Manhattan)
11 Times Square
Office buildings completed in 2011
Times Square buildings
Eighth Avenue (Manhattan)
2011 establishments in New York City